Grand Princess Anna Vasilievna of Ryazan (1451–1501) was a Russian noblewoman, Regent of the Ryazan Principality in 1483 and in 1500–1501, during the minority of her son and grandson. She was the only daughter of Grand Prince Vasily II of Moscow and the mother and grandmother of last Grand Princes of Ryazan Principality. Anna was born in Moscow to the family of Vasily II of Moscow, who was blinded five years before her birth during a time of troubles, and Maria Yaroslavna of Borovsk.

Life
Before his death in 1456 Grand Prince Ivan Fyodorovich of Ryazan entrusted his friend Vasily of Moscow with temporary governing of the principality and taking care of his children Vasily and Theodosia until their maturity. But soon after Ivan's death Vasily of Moscow moved orphans to Moscow and appointed a voevoda to Ryazan. This decision started a process of joining of Ryazan Principality to the Grand Duchy of Moscow. Vasily II's heir Ivan III of Russia continued his father's policy towards Ryazan and Anna grew together with Ryazan prince Vasily.

Marriage
When Anna grew up her mother has decided to marry Anna and Vasily. She asked her son Ivan III to delay annexation of Ryazan because it was not suitable to a Grand Princess to marry an ordinary nobleman even of princely descent. Ivan III agreed and allowed on Summer 1464 to return sixteen-year Prince Vasily to his family seat. But the same winter he came to Moscow to marry Anna and, after the wedding, the couple returned to Ryazan.

In 1467 Anna bore a son Ivan and until the death of her husband in 1483 did not participate in governing the principality and did not protest when her brother two times annexed Ryazan territories.

Regency
In 1483 Anna became the regent of her sixteen-year son. In her policy Anna tried to expand her domain, she visited often Moscow and due her diplomatic efforts the Pronsk principality was added to Ryazan. A major problem in Ryazan-Moscow relations was so-called ryazan ukraina, a huge steppe region in the basin of Don River. According to treaties, Ryazan was obliged not to settle in these lands, but many years Ryazan princes secretly colonized this area and during the Anna's regency this process become much more significant. Numerous immigrants received considerable privileges, being released for 3–7 years from taxes if agreed to remain in steppe for ever.

Anna's son died in 1500 and until her death in 1501 she was the regent of her grandson Ivan V of Ryazan. After the end of Anna's reign Ryazan Principality finally lost its independence. Except of Ivan, Anna had son Fyodor and daughter Anna who was married to Lithuanian Prince Feodor Ivanovich Belski.

References
 
  Славянская энциклопедия. Киевская Русь-Московия. Т. 1: А-М, Published by Olma Media Group, 2001,  (available in Google Books)

1451 births
1501 deaths
Grand Princes of Ryazan
Rurikids
15th-century women rulers
16th-century women rulers
16th-century monarchs in Europe
15th-century Russian people
16th-century Russian people
15th-century Russian women
16th-century Russian women